Bisharpara Kodaliya railway station is a Kolkata Suburban Railway station in Bisharpara. It serves the local areas of Bisharpara and Kodaliya in the North 24 Parganas district, West Bengal, India. Its code is BRPK. The station consists of two platforms. The platforms are poorly sheltered. Facilities include water and sanitation. The station lacks a proper train announcement system and a proper approach road.

History
This station was built in 2008. Earlier it was a halt station where only a few suburban trains halted but now most of the trains stop here. Earlier people of this localities had to go to New Barrackpur railway station or Birati railway station to board trains. The station has improved accessibility and catalyzed local development.

Bisharpara Kodaliya is located on Sealdah–Hasnabad–Bangaon–Ranaghat line of Kolkata Suburban Railway. The link between Dum Dum to Khulna now in Bangladesh, via Bangaon was constructed by Bengal Central Railway Company in 1882–84. The Sealah–Dum Dum–Barasat–Ashok Nagar–Bangaon sector was electrified in 1963–64.

Layout

See also

References

External links
Bisharpara Kodaliya railway station map
 

Sealdah railway division
Railway stations in North 24 Parganas district
Transport in Kolkata
Kolkata Suburban Railway stations